Ümit Hussein is a British literary translator and interpreter based in Seville, Spain. She has translated many books from Turkish to English, including the works of such authors as Ahmet Altan, Yavuz Ekinci, Sine Ergün, Nevin Halıcı, Burhan Sönmez, Nermin Yıldırım, and Mehmet Yaşın.

Hussein's translations have been significant in "putting Turkish literature on the map" by making it accessible to non-Turkish speakers, as well as to the second and third-generation Turks and Cypriots in the United Kingdom.

Early life and career
Hussein was born in Bethnal Green and raised in Tottenham, London. Her parents are both Turkish Cypriot, consequently, Hussein grew up bilingual speaking both Turkish and English. She later also learned French, Italian, and Spanish. Hussein studied Italian and European Literature and graduated with an MA in Literary Translation from the University of East Anglia. Her first book translation was an experimental novel by Mehmet Yaşın called Soydaşınız Balık Burcu.

Awards
In 2018, her translation of Burhan Sönmez’s Istanbul Istanbul won the inaugural EBRD Literature Prize.

Personal life
She currently resides in Seville, Spain.

References

Year of birth missing (living people)
Living people
Alumni of the University of East Anglia
British people of Turkish Cypriot descent
British emigrants to Spain
Turkish–English translators
20th-century British translators
21st-century British translators
Literary translators